White Rose Lane is a   Local Nature Reserve in Woking in Surrey. It is owned and managed by  Woking Borough Council.

This site is damp alder woodland in two areas on the north bank of the Hoe Stream. There are several species of rare fungi and fauna include owls, bats, deer and frogs.

There is access from the road called White Rose Lane.

References

Local Nature Reserves in Surrey